Teinotarsina is a genus of moths in the family Sesiidae.

Species
Teinotarsina aurantiaca Yagi, Hirowatari & Arita, 2016
Teinotarsina flavicincta (Arita & Gorbunov, 2002)
Teinotarsina litchivora (Yang & Wang, 1989)
Teinotarsina longipes (Felder, 1861)
Teinotarsina longitarsa  Arita & Gorbunov, 2002
Teinotarsina lushanensis (Xu & Liu, 1999)
Teinotarsina luteopoda  Kallies & Arita, 2004
Teinotarsina melanostoma (Diakonoff, [1968])
Teinotarsina micans (Diakonoff, [1968])
Teinotarsina nonggangensis (Yang & Wang, 1989)
Teinotarsina rubripes (Pagenstecher, 1900)

References

Sesiidae